The National Academy of Design is an honorary association of American artists, founded in New York City in 1825 by Samuel Morse, Asher Durand, Thomas Cole, Martin E. Thompson, Charles Cushing Wright, Ithiel Town, and others "to promote the fine arts in America through instruction and exhibition." Membership is limited to 450 American artists and architects, who are elected by their peers on the basis of recognized excellence.

History

The original founders of the National Academy of Design were students of the American Academy of the Fine Arts. However, by 1825 the students of the American Academy felt a lack of support for teaching from the academy, its board composed of merchants, lawyers, and physicians, and from its unsympathetic president, the painter John Trumbull.

Samuel Morse and other students set about forming a drawing association to meet several times each week for the study of the art of design. Still, the association was viewed as a dependent organization of the American Academy, from which they felt neglected. An attempt was made to reconcile differences and maintain a single academy by appointing six of the artists from the association as directors of the American Academy. When four of the nominees were not elected, however, the frustrated artists resolved to form a new academy and the National Academy of Design was born.

Morse had been a student at the Royal Academy in London and emulated its structure and goals for the National Academy of Design. The mission of the academy, from its foundation, was to "promote the fine arts in America through exhibition and education."

In 2015, the academy struggled with financial hardship. In the next few years, it closed its museum and art school, and created an endowment through the sale of its New York real estate holdings. Today, the academy advocates for the arts as a tool for education, celebrates the role of artists and architects in public life, and serves as a catalyst for cultural conversations that propel society forward.

According to the academy, its 450 National Academicians "are professional artists and architects who are elected to membership by their peers annually."

Official names
After three years and some tentative names, in 1828 the academy found its longstanding name "National Academy of Design", under which it was known to one and a half centuries. In 1997, newly appointed director Annette Blaugrund rebranded the institution as the "National Academy Museum and School of Fine Art", to reflect "a new spirit of integration incorporating the association of artists, museum, and school", and to avoid confusion with the now differently understood term "design".
This change was reversed in 2017.
 1825 The New York Drawing Association
 1826 The National Academy of The Arts of Design
 1828 The National Academy of Design
 1997 The National Academy Museum and School of Fine Art
 2017 The National Academy of Design

Locations
The academy occupied several locations in Manhattan over the years. Notable among them was a building on Park Avenue and 23rd Street designed by architect P. B. Wight and built 1863–1865 in a Venetian Gothic style modeled on the Doge's Palace in Venice. Another location was at West 109th Street and Amsterdam Avenue. From 1906 to 1941, the academy occupied the American Fine Arts Society building at 215 West 57th Street.

From 1942 to 2019, the academy occupied a mansion on Fifth Avenue and Eighty-ninth Street, the former home of sculptor Anna Hyatt Huntington and philanthropist Archer M. Huntington, who donated the house in 1940.

Currently, the National Academy of Design shares offices and galleries with the National Arts Club located inside the historic Samuel J. Tilden House, 14-15 Gramercy Park South.

Organization and activities

The academy is a professional honorary organization, with a school and a museum.

One cannot apply for membership, which since 1994, after many changes in numbers, is limited to 450 American artists and architects. Instead, members are elected by their peers on the basis of recognized excellence. Full members of the National Academy are identified by the post-nominal "NA" (National Academician), associates by "ANA".

At the heart of the National Academy is their ever-growing collection. Academicians choose and contribute a work of their own creation, building upon the academy's distinguished legacy. Today, their permanent collection totals over 8,000 works and tells a singular history of American art and architecture as constructed by its creators. The Academy organizes major exhibitions and loans their works to leading institutions around the world, in addition to providing resources that foster scholarship across disciplines.

Notable instructors
Among the teaching staff were numerous artists, including Will Hicok Low, who taught from 1889 to 1892. Another was Charles Louis Hinton, whose long tenure started in 1901. The famous American poet William Cullen Bryant also gave lectures. Architect Alexander Jackson Davis taught at the academy. Painter Lemuel Wilmarth was the first full-time instructor. Silas Dustin was a curator.

Notable members

 Marina Abramović
 Benjamin Abramowitz
 James Henry Beard
 Edwin Blashfield
 Lee Bontecou
 Stanley Boxer
 Walker O. Cain
 John F. Carlson
 Vija Celmins
 William Merritt Chase
 Frederic Edwin Church
 Chuck Close
 Thomas Cole
 Colin Campbell Cooper
 Leon Dabo
 Cyrus Dallin
 William Parsons Winchester Dana
 Charles Harold Davis
 Henry Golden Dearth
 Jose de Creeft
 Richard Diebenkorn
 William Henry Drake
 Thomas Eakins
 Lydia Field Emmet
 Herbert Ferber
 Bruce Fowle
 Helen Frankenthaler
 Gilbert Franklin
 Daniel Chester French
 Frederick Carl Frieseke
 Sonia Gechtoff
 Frank Gehry
 Paul Georges
 Arthur Hill Gilbert
 Aaron Goodelman
 Hardie Gramatky
 Horatio Greenough
 Red Grooms
 Armin Hansen
 L. Birge Harrison
 Edward Lamson Henry
 Itshak Holtz
 Winslow Homer
 Cecil de Blaquiere Howard
 George Inness
 Jasper Johns
 Frank Tenney Johnson
 Lester Johnson
 Wolf Kahn
 Charles Keck
 Ellsworth Kelly
 Greta Kempton
 Everett Raymond Kinstler
 Chaim Koppelman
 Leo Lentelli
 Emanuel Leutze
 Hayley Lever
 Maya Lin
 Frank Lobdell
 Evelyn Beatrice Longman
 Frederick William Macmonnies
 Knox Martin
 Jervis McEntee
 Michael Mazur
 Gari Melchers
 Alme Meyvis
 Raoul Middleman
 F. Luis Mora
 Henry Siddons Mowbray
 John Mulvany
 David Dalhoff Neal
 Victor Nehlig
 Eliot Noyes
 Kate Orff
 Tom Otterness
 William Page
 Philip Pearlstein
 I. M. Pei
 John Thomas Peele
 Judy Pfaff
 Renzo Piano
 William Lamb Picknell
 Albin Polasek
 Alfred Easton Poor
 John Portman
 Alexander Phimister Proctor
 Harvey Quaytman
 Andrew Raftery
 Robert Rauschenberg
 Benjamin Franklin Reinhart
 Paul Resika
 Priscilla Roberts
 Dorothea Rockburne
 Norman Rockwell
 Mario Romañach
 Albert Pinkham Ryder
 Robert Ryman
 Augustus Saint-Gaudens
 John Singer Sargent
 Eugene Francis Savage
 Emily Maria Scott
 Richard Serra
 Susan Louise Shatter
 Lorraine Shemesh
 Elliott Fitch Shepard
 Rhoda Sherbell
 Cindy Sherman
 William Siegel
 Hughie Lee-Smith
 Nancy Spero
 Frederic Dorr Steele
 Theodore Clement Steele
 Frank Stella
 Arthur Fitzwilliam Tait
 Katharine Lamb Tait
 Jesse Talbot
 Reuben Tam
 Henry Ossawa Tanner
 Edmund C. Tarbell
 Louis Comfort Tiffany
 Cy Twombly
 Edward Charles Volkert
 Robert Vonnoh
 William Guy Wall
 John Quincy Adams Ward
 Harry Watrous
 Carrie Mae Weems
 Stow Wengenroth
 Frederic Whitaker
 Carleton Wiggins
 Guy Carleton Wiggins
 Anita Willets-Burnham
 Frank Lloyd Wright
 Jimmy Wright
 Dorothy Weir Young
 Milford Zornes
 William Penn Morgan

See also
 American Watercolor Society (located within the National Academy of Design)
 Effects of the financial crisis of 2007–2009 on museums
 List of museums and cultural institutions in New York City

References

External links

Virtual tour of the National Academy of Design at Google Arts & Culture

 
1825 establishments in New York (state)
23rd Street (Manhattan)
Academies of arts
Art museums and galleries in New York City
Art museums established in 1825
Art schools in New York City
Clubs and societies in New York City
Design museums in New York (state)
Fifth Avenue
Learned societies of the United States
Museums in Manhattan
Organizations established in 1825
Upper East Side
Venetian Gothic architecture in the United States